The Battle of Schleswig occurred near Dannevirke on Easter morning, 23 April 1848 as the second battle of the First Schleswig War of 1848–1850.

Prussia had just entered the war and had sent almost 12,000 troops to Schleswig-Holstein.  Counting reserves, General Wrangel commanded in total more than 18,000 men – almost three times the size of the Danish forces. The German Reich troops did not participate in the battle, but their presence forced the Danes to fight defensively against the Prussians.

Battle
On a cold and wet spring morning, the Germans went on the attack. The plan of the Prussian leader, General von Wrangel, was to move the army up to a point just south of Dannevirke, camp there, and attack the following day. But the Prussian Guard on the right wing (which at that time was a good distance in front of the left wing) arrived at the rally and met virtually no Danes, so the commander decided to go against Bustrup and Frederiksberg (Kratbjerg). Here, southeast of Bustrup, they were met by the Danish avant-garde. The Danes were outnumbered by 1.5:1 and had to retire to two small hills, Galgebjerg and Risbjerg. General von Wrangel, ordered the leader of the left wing, General von Bonin, west to Lille Dannevirke.

Shortly afterwards, however, he decided instead to attack the two small hills north of Bustrup, and ordered von Bonin to turn around, but the order reached only the rear of Bonin's column. At that time, the Danes, with the 1st and 11th Battalion, went on the counterattack against the Prussians at Bustrup. The Prussian lines faltered until the rear of Bonin's column, under Colonel Steimetz, attacked the Danes' left flank and sent them on the run. This led to a general Danish withdrawal to the hill Jordbærbjerg, and the Prussians occupied Friedrichberg. When Bonin reached the area south of Lille Dannevirke, he suddenly discovered that almost half of his troops were missing. At that time he was finally ordered to turn around, but when he faced the Danish troops, he decided to stay and soon after receiving reinforcements from the Schleswig-Holsteinian troops, he attacked, and the Danes withdrew to Husby and later to Skovby.

On the eastern wing, the Prussians took Jordbærbjerg, and fierce fighting unfolded around the scrub-covered hills and a farm (Kratbakkerne and Annettehøj). The Danes planned to attempt a counterattack but this was called off and a general, but orderly, withdrawal was carried out. The day belonged to the Prussians and the Schleswig-Holsteinians, but the Danish forces under Colonel Læssøe had defended themselves skilfully, and the losses were limited. However, an appallingly large number of the wounded died.

Aftermath
The battle lead to an acute bout of discouragement in Denmark – a sharp reversal from the optimism of the March entry of Denmark into war. The army withdrew to Funen leaving Jutland open to Wrangel's troops.
The battle inspired writer Carl Ploug to write a song about the battle, "" (full text)

References

External links
 Battle of Schleswig (Danish Military History site) [in Danish]

Schleswig
Schleswig
Schleswig
Schleswig
1848 in Denmark
April 1848 events
1848 in Germany